Hamim bin Haji Samuri (born 13 June 1958) is a Malaysian politician and was the Member of Parliament of Malaysia for the Ledang constituency in the State of Johor from 2004 to 2018. He is a member of the United Malay National Organisation (UMNO) party in the previously governing Barisan Nasional (BN) coalition.

Political career
Hamim was elected to federal Parliament in the 2004 election. The seat had previously been held by UMNO's Hashim Ismail. He was reelected again in 2008 election and 2013 election but was defeated in 2018 election.

Background
Hamim is married and he has four children. He has a degree in Civil Engineering from the University of Glasgow. In 2013, he obtained his Master in Management from Universiti Utara Malaysia and Doctor of Philosophy (PhD) in Development Management, also from Universiti Utara Malaysia in 2016.

Election results

Honours
  :
  Medallist of the Order of the Defender of the Realm (PPN) (2000)
  Officer of the Order of the Defender of the Realm (KMN) (2006)
  Commander of the Order of Meritorious Service (PJN) - Datuk (2013)

See also
Ledang (federal constituency)

References

1958 births
Living people
People from Johor
Commanders of the Order of Meritorious Service
Malaysian people of Malay descent
Malaysian Muslims
Alumni of the University of Glasgow
Medallists of the Order of the Defender of the Realm
Officers of the Order of the Defender of the Realm
Malaysian engineers
Members of the Dewan Rakyat
United Malays National Organisation politicians
21st-century Malaysian politicians